Survive the Game (also known as Killing Field) is a 2021 American action thriller film directed by James Cullen Bressack, and starring Bruce Willis and Chad Michael Murray.

It was released in the United States on October 8, 2021 by Lionsgate.

Plot
When David, a cop, gets injured during a drug bust gone wrong, his partner, Cal, pursues the two culprits to a remote farm owned by Eric, a troubled veteran. As Cal and Eric plan their defense, more of the gang arrives—along with a wounded David. Outnumbered, the three men must now use stealth, smarts and marksmanship to take down the drug-dealing mob.

Cast
 Bruce Willis as Det. David Watson
 Chad Michael Murray as Eric
 Swen Temmel as Cal
 Michael Sirow as Frank
 Kate Katzman as Violet
 Zack Ward as Mickey Jean
 Donna D'Errico as Carly
 Canyon Prince as Andrew
 Sarah Roemer as Hannah
 Sean Kanan as Ed

Release
The film was released in select theaters and on VOD on October 8, 2021 and on Blu-ray and DVD on October 12, 2021.

Box office
As of August 27, 2022, Survive the Game grossed $59,347 in the United Arab Emirates.

Reception
The film has a 14% rating on Rotten Tomatoes based on 7 reviews.

Bobby LePire of Film Threat rated the film an 8 out of 10 and wrote "Survive The Game may tell an oft-told story, but the script avoids most well-worn tropes in favor of a no-frills actioner."

Accolades
Bruce Willis was nominated for his performance in this movie, as he was for all movies he appeared in, in 2021, in the category Worst Performance by Bruce Willis in a 2021 Movie at the Golden Raspberry Awards. The category was later rescinded after he announced his retirement due to aphasia.

References

External links
 

American action thriller films
Lionsgate films
2021 action films
2021 independent films
2020s English-language films
Films set on farms
Films directed by James Cullen Bressack
2020s American films